Peter Miles , born Peter Kanyike, is a Ugandan reggae and dancehall artist. He sings in Luganda, Patwa and English. He appeared on the Vuqa cypher, A song alongside rappers Bigtril, The mith,  Ruyonga, St Nelly Sade and more others in 2016.

Early life and education
Peter Miles was born on  29 September 1980 in Entebbe, Uganda. He attended Budo junior school, St Lawrence secondary, Kabojja high school and Makerere University.

Music
Miles has collaborated with artists like Navio (rapper), Elephant Man (musician) on the remix of "Nice and polite", Demarco (musician) on "Blessings", "General Levy" on "Ooh Aah". He has had hits songs like "One time","Owange","Muwala","Ruckus","Oah Aah" and "Combination". Miles has won a number of awards in Africa including: Best Ragga artist/group PAM AWARDS for 2 years,) Best Ragga dancehall video Channel O awards (SOUTH AFRICA) Best Dancehall Video Kisima awards (KENYA). On 7 June 2007, Peter Miles was the only artist from East and Central Africa selected to perform at the anti G8 summit concert code named the"P8 concert" in Rostock"Germany alongside big European bands like U2, Bono, Bob Geldolf, Seed and Africa's Youssou N’dour.

Discography
One time
Tumetokachini
Love
Nice and polite
Ooh ahh
Blessings
Front line
Nyinimu
Ruckus
Muwala

Awards and recognition
Best East African Video at Channel O Spirit of Africa Music Video Awards, 2007.

References 

1980 births
21st-century Ugandan male singers
Living people
Makerere University alumni
Kumusha